Point Aux Roches Light, sometimes referred to as Pointe Au Roches or Point Au Roches, is a lighthouse on Lake Champlain in New York.  It is just north of Point Au Roches State Park.

The US Coast Guard sold the property in the 1930s.  It is a private residence now.

References

External links
 Lighthouse Friends site
 
 National Park Service Historic Lighthouses
 NPS Point Aux Roches

Lighthouses completed in 1858
Lighthouses in New York (state)
Transportation buildings and structures in Clinton County, New York